Kazak may refer to:

Places
 Kazak, Bulgaria, a village
 Kazak, Iran, a village in Fars Province
 Kazak Island, Antarctica
 6110 Kazak, a main-belt asteroid

Other uses
 Cossacks, a Slavic-speaking social group of Eastern Europe
 Kazakhs, a Turkic-speaking ethnic group of Central Asia
 Kazakh language, a Turkic language
 Kazak (surname)
 Kazak, a fictionan dog in the Vonnegut novel The Sirens of Titan

See also
 Qazaq, the language spoken by the Kazakhs
 Qazaq (journal), a Kazakh language newspaper published in the early 20th century
Kazakh (disambiguation)
Kozak (disambiguation)
Kozakov (disambiguation)
Cossack (disambiguation)